Harichandanam was an Indian Malayalam-language television soap opera that aired on Asianet from 24 May 2010 to 4 May 2012. Sujitha portrays the lead character of Unnimaya. It had been receiving the highest ratings of Malayalam serials and received high praising from viewers.

Plot
Harichandanam portrays the trails and tribulations of Unnimaya.

Cast
Main Cast
Sujitha as Unnimaya
Kishore as Mahadevan
Sarath Das as Niranjan
Mallika Sukumaran as Draupathi
Dinesh Panicker as Venkidi
Meenakshi Sunil as Uma
Sreelatha Namboothiri as Mangalathu Rajeshwari Amma
Mahalakshmi as Rose (Dubbed by Neelima Rani)
Maneesh Krishna
Sabarna as Honey
Poojappura Radhakrishnan
Deepa Jayan
Anwar Shereef as Hafiz
Shibu Laban as Madhavan 
Vishnu Prakash
Saranya Sasi
Vallikode Vikraman
Cherthala Lalitha
Kanakalatha
Kaladharan
Sonia
Deepika Mohan
Geetha Nair
Sini Varghese

References

Malayalam-language television shows
2010 Indian television series debuts
Asianet (TV channel) original programming